Jack Sim (born 1957) is the founder of the Restroom Association of Singapore, the World Toilet Organization, the World Toilet Day initiative and Bottom of the Pyramid (BoP) Hub.  Formerly from the construction industry, he decided to devote the rest of his life to social work after attaining financial independence at the age of 40.

In 2001, for "creating good will and bringing the subject into the open" and "mobilizing national support in providing on-the-ground expertise" he received the Schwab Foundation award for Social Entrepreneur of the Year. In 2007, Jack was elected a Fellow of Ashoka: Innovators for the Public, and also became one of the key members to convene the Sustainable Sanitation Alliance which is composed of key players in the sanitation space.

Jack was named one of the Heroes of the Environment for 2008 by Time magazine.

He also founded the BOP HUB and a series of social businesses and startups. He is now constructing a 65,000 sq ft World Trade Center for the Poor in Singapore to coordinate an effort to transform the 4 billion poor into a massively efficient marketplace to end global poverty.

Achievements in sanitation

Restroom Association 
He established the Restroom Association of Singapore (RAS) in 1998, which addresses the state of dirty public toilets in designs, building codes and poorly trained cleaners.

World Toilet Organization 

Realising the need for a global body on the subject, Jack created the World Toilet Organization (WTO) in 2001 as a global network and service platform for toilet associations, academia, government, UN agencies and toilet stakeholders to learn from one another and leverage media and corporate support that in turn influenced governments to promote sound sanitation and public health policies.

Since its inception, WTO organized 17 World Toilet Summits and two World Toilet Expo and Forum straddling Singapore, Seoul, Taipei, Beijing, Belfast, Moscow, New Delhi, Macau, Shanghai, Bangkok, Philadelphia, Durban (South Africa), Hainan China, Solo Indonesia, Kuching Malaysia, Melbourne, and Mumbai.

It supports Prime Minister Modi's Swachh Bharat Mission in implementing 110 million toilets in India and President Xi China Toilet Revolution in Tourism Toilets and Rural Toilets. WTO has also built 13 blocks of Rainbow Schools Toilets in rural China.

World Toilet Day 

World Toilet Organization declared its founding day 19 November in 2001, as World Toilet Day and this is now celebrated worldwide each year towards improving the state of toilets and sanitation globally. In 2013, all 193 countries of the UN General Assembly unanimously adopted 19 November as the official UN World Toilet Day.

Professional career 
 2018: Founded Nation Builders 
 2018: Founded School of Gumption
 2017: Founded 45Rice
 2017: Founded Clinicai
 2011: Founder, Base of the Pyramid Hub
 2005: Founder, World Toilet College
 2001: Founder, World Toilet Organization
 1996 – 2006: Founder & President, Restroom Association
 1993 – 2003: Investor & Founding Partner, Australian International School, Singapore
 1992-2000: Founder & Director, TBF Sdn. Bhd
 1986 – 1997: Founded group of real estate development companies: Nest Development Pte Ltd; Nest Land Pte Ltd; Nest Realty Pte Ltd; Very Useful Ideas Pte Ltd; Terrazorium Pte Ltd
 1986: Founder, Maybricks Sdn. Bhd
 1984 – 2004: Founder & CEO, BESCO Building Supplies (SEA) Pte Ltd. Singapore
 1983 – 1984: Director, Dalton-Sitraplast Building Supplies Pte Ltd
 1979 – 1982: Site-Supervisor & Sales Engineer, Diethelm Singapore

Education 
 Professional Diploma in Real Estate Marketing, Singapore Institute of Surveyor & Valuers, Singapore
 Post-Graduate Diploma in International Marketing, Strathclyde University, Scotland
 Diploma in Business Administration, National Productivity Board, Singapore
 Master in Public Administration, Lee Kuan Yew School of Public Policy, Singapore
 The Global Solution Program, Singularity University, Nasa, San Francisco

In the media 
A documentary about Sim's toilet activist work which was filmed over five years, Mr. Toilet, made its world premiere at North America's largest documentary festival, Hot Docs Canadian International Documentary Festival on 27 April 2019.

Awards and appointments 
 2018: Awarded Her Majesty Queen Elizabeth Commonwealth Points of Light Award
 2018: Awarded Luxembourg Peace Prize for Activist
 2017: Given Honorary Professorship by Shobhit University, Uttar Pradesh India
 2016: Awarded President's Award for Volunteerism and/or Philanthropy (Adult), Singapore   
2015: Appointed as Co-convenor of India’s Swachh Andhra Pradesh Initiative  
2014: TedxSalford: Jack Sim spoke at the TEDxSalford conference in October 
2014: Appointed Samoa Village Chief with the Matai Title of Tuifalevao
2012: First Synergos Senior Fellow from Singapore, New York 
2011: Made commitment at the Clinton Global Initiatives to found BOP HUB
2011: Reader’s Digest Magazine named him Asian of the Year
2009: Channel News Asia named him Asian of the Year
2008: Appointed to the World Economic Forum’s Global Agenda Council for Water Security and the GAC for Social Entrepreneurship
2008: Named Hero of the Environment by Time Magazine. 
2008: Asian Development Bank named him an ADB Water Champion
2007: First Singaporean elected to be an Ashoka Global Fellow 
2006: Recipient of Schwab Foundation's (Switzerland) of Social Entrepreneur of the Year Award  
2004: Recipient of Ministry of Environment's Green Plan 2012 Award

References

External links

Biography at the World Toilet Organization.
Ashoka Profile of Jack Sim at Ashoka web site
Film "Meet Mr Toilet"

Singaporean people of Chinese descent
Singaporean businesspeople
Singaporean activists
Living people
1957 births
Sanitation